AJZ or ajz may refer to:

 Australian Journal of Zoology, an international peer-reviewed scientific journal published by CSIRO Publishing
 ajz, the ISO 639-3 code for Amri language, Assam and Meghalaya
 Andreas John Ziegler, an American wrestler